Advanced composite materials refers to the following titles:

Advanced composite materials (science & engineering)
Advanced Composite Materials (journal)